The Kokangol (Koko-Gol), or Yuwula, are said to have been an Indigenous Australian people of Queensland. Some dispute this, suggesting the name may be a synonym for Aghu Tharnggala, or may simply be the name of a language consultant.

Country
The Kokangol were, in Norman Tindale's estimation, a distinct people from their neighbours, the Olkola, and lived on the Upper Alice River. Their territory extended over some 1,800 sq-miles, and they lived inland from the Yir-Yoront.

People
The original population was estimated in 1897 to be around 600 people. There are very few explicit references to these people, apart from William Parry-Okeden 's report and passing mention in a volume on Queensland aboriginal rock-art by Percy Trezise and Dick Roughsey.

Alternative names
 Koko-Gol
 Kookakolkoloa
 Juwula (language name)
 Oco-carnigal.
 Aj juwalnga
 Galbawa
 Kalpawa
 Kookakolkoloa
 Owonmunga.

Notes and references

Explanatory notes

Notes

References

Aboriginal peoples of Queensland